Blizzard Albany (formerly Vicarious Visions, Inc.) is an American video game developer based in Albany, New York. The studio was acquired by Activision in January 2005. After releasing its last game as part of that company, Tony Hawk's Pro Skater 1 + 2, Vicarious Visions became part of Activision's sister company Blizzard Entertainment in January 2021 and was merged into it in April 2022, thereby being renamed Blizzard Albany.

History 

The studio was founded by brothers Karthik and Guha Bala in 1991 while they were in high school. In the late 1990s, Vicarious Visions appointed Michael Marvin, an Albany-based investor and entrepreneur, and founder and former CEO of MapInfo Corporation; and Charles S. Jones, investor, who sat on the boards of various software and industrial companies including Geac and PSDI, to its board of directors. Under their leadership, a sale of the company was negotiated to Activision, earning the original investors over 20x their initial investment. In January 2005, Vicarious Visions was acquired by publisher Activision. In June 2007, Activision closed the Vicarious Visions' office in Mountain View, California. On April 5, 2016, the Bala brothers announced that they had left the company. The brothers then founded Velan Studios in November 2016.

On January 22, 2021, Vicarious Visions was moved by Activision Blizzard from a subsidiary of Activision to a subsidiary of Blizzard Entertainment. Going forward, the more than 200 employees of Vicarious Visions will be employees of Blizzard. Vicarious had been working with Blizzard for about two years prior to this announcement, and specifically on the planned remaster of Diablo II, Diablo II: Resurrected, and Blizzard felt the move would be best as to have Vicarious' group provide continued support not only on the remaster but also on other Diablo properties including Diablo IV. Vicarious Visions studio head Jen Oneal moved to Blizzard's management and was succeeded by Simon Ebejer, previously the studio's chief operating officer. On October 27, 2021, Blizzard informed Vicarious Visions employees that the studio would change its name. The studio was fully merged into Blizzard on April 12, 2022, and was renamed Blizzard Albany, otherwise retaining its offices.

Blizzard Albany's QA team, about 20 members in size, announced a unionization drive in July 2022 as GWA Albany. It follows Raven Software, another Activision Blizzard subsidiary, whose QA team voted to unionize earlier in the year.

Game history 
Terminus, an online multiplayer space trading and combat simulation game, won two Independent Games Festival Awards in 1999. They became known as a leading developer of handheld games breaking ground by the Tony Hawk's Pro Skater series, developing Game Boy Advance and Nintendo DS titles in the franchise's main series as well as one spin off. They developed the first three Crash Bandicoot GBA games. Vicarious Visions developed Spider-Man, Spider-Man 2: Enter Electro, Ultimate Spider-Man, Crash Nitro Kart, Star Wars Jedi Knight II: Jedi Outcast, Star Wars Jedi Knight: Jedi Academy, and Doom 3 for the Xbox. Vicarious Visions developed for the Guitar Hero series on the Nintendo DS and Wii platforms. For Guitar Hero: On Tour, Vicarious Visions created the "Guitar Grip" peripheral for the Nintendo DS, which emulates the guitar controller for the portable system.

It was revealed on June 10, 2011, that Vicarious Visions was working on the 3DS version of Skylanders: Spyro's Adventure, and would go on to have an important role in developing the Skylanders game series, creating the games Skylanders: Swap Force and Skylanders: SuperChargers. On December 8, 2016, Vicarious Visions announced that they were partnering with Bungie to work on the Destiny franchise.

Game engine 
Vicarious Visions Alchemy is the company's game engine. It was released in 2002. It was originally called Intrinsic Alchemy and developed by Intrinsic Graphics before being renamed after Vicarious Visions acquired Intrinsic Graphics in 2003.

Games developed

Cancelled games

Notes

References

External links 
 

1991 establishments in New York (state)
2005 mergers and acquisitions
2021 mergers and acquisitions
American companies established in 1991
Blizzard Entertainment
Colonie, New York
Companies based in Albany County, New York
Former Activision subsidiaries
Video game companies established in 1991
Video game companies of the United States
Video game development companies